Rabbe Arnfinn Enckell (3 March 1903 – 17 June 1974) was a Finnish writer and poet.  Enckell is regarded as one of the stalwarts of the Swedo-Finnish poetic revival that began in the 1920s. 

Enckell was born in Tammela, Tavastia Proper.  He studied art in France and Italy. In 1923 he brought out his first poetry collection, entitled Dikter. It was a collection of impressionistic nature poems. The collection and its sequel, Flöjtblåsarlycka (The Flutist’s Happiness), which was published in 1925, were contained Enckell's vivid description of the changes in nature. Enckell was a modernist. For a year in 1928-29 he worked for the avant-garde journal Quosego. He then wrote a couple of semi-autobiographical novels, which included Ljusdunkel (1930). He returned to poetry with the publication of The Cistern of Spring (1931). He followed it with The Sounding Board (1935). The modernist streak in his poetry prompted comparisons with T.S. Eliot. Enckell brought out another collection of poems, The Vault, which was published in 1937.  He died in Helsinki, aged 71.

Works
 Dikter (Poems, poems, 1923)
 Flöjtblåsarlyckan (Flautist's Luck, poems, 1925)
 Tillblivelse (Genesis, short stories, 1929)
 Ljusdunkel (short stories, 1930),
 Ett porträtt (A Portrait, short stories, 1931)
 Vårens cistern (The Cistern of Spring, poems, 1931)
 Landskapet med den dubbla skuggan (The Landscape with Double Shadows, poems, 1933)
 Tonbrädet (poems, 1935)
 Herrar till natt och dag (short stories, 1937).
 Lutad över brunnen (Learning over the Well, poems, 1942)
 Andedräkt av koppar (Breath of Copper, poems, 1947),
 Sett och återbördat (1950)
 Essay om livets framfart (An Essay about the Ravages of Life, a collection of essays, 1961)
 Det är dags (1965)
 Flyende spegel (1974)

References

1903 births
1974 deaths
People from Tammela, Finland
People from Häme Province (Grand Duchy of Finland)
Finnish people of German descent
Finnish writers in Swedish
Finnish poets in Swedish
University of Helsinki alumni
Recipients of the Eino Leino Prize
20th-century poets